The Angolan hylomyscus or Angolan wood mouse (Hylomyscus carillus) is a species of rodent in the family Muridae.

It is found only in Angola.

Its natural habitat is subtropical or tropical dry forest.

References

 

Hylomyscus
Rodents of Africa
Endemic fauna of Angola
Mammals of Angola
Mammals described in 1904
Taxa named by Oldfield Thomas
Taxonomy articles created by Polbot